Andrewville is an unincorporated community in Kent County, Delaware,  United States. It is located west of Farmington on Andrewville Road.

History
Andrewville's population was 54 in 1900. 

The Bethel Methodist Protestant Church was added to the National Register of Historic Places in 1998.

References

Unincorporated communities in Kent County, Delaware
Unincorporated communities in Delaware